Sayalgudi is a town panchayat in Ramanathapuram district of Tamil Nadu State in India .

Demographics 
 India census, Sayalgudi had a population of 12,049. Males constitute 50% of the population and females 50%. Sayalgudi has an average literacy rate of 68%, higher than the national average of 59.5%; male literacy is 77%, and female literacy is 59%. 12% of the population is under 6 years of age.

References 

Revenue villages in Kadaladi taluk
Cities and towns in Ramanathapuram district